Shabab El Bourj Sporting Club is a football club based in Bourj el-Barajneh, Beirut, Lebanon, that competes in the . The club was founded in 1967 as Al Irshad SC, and changed their name to Shabab El Bourj SC in 2017.

History 
Founded in 1967 as Al Irshad SC, the club changed their name to Shabab El Bourj SC in 2017. They were promoted to the Lebanese Premier League for the first time under their new name in 2019, after gaining back to back promotions from the Fourth Division. They became the first Lebanese team to achieve this feat.

Following Shabab Bourj's failure to comply to FIFA's request for them to compensate former player Lorougnon Christ Remi, and rumours of a merger with Safa, the club withdrew from the league. On 30 May 2022, the LFA announced that Shabab Bourj were fined £L12.5 million, were relegated to the Second Division, and that all of their matches in the championship round were voided.

Club rivalries 
Shabab Bourj has rivalries with Bourj and Shabab Sahel, due to the fact that they are all based in the Dahieh area.

Players

Current squad

Honours
 Lebanese Third Division: 1996–97

See also 
 List of football clubs in Lebanon

Notes

References

External links

 Shabab El Bourj SC at LebanonFG

 
Football clubs in Lebanon